Lidoriki (Katharevousa: Λιδωρίκιον) is a village and a former municipality in Phocis, Greece. Since the 2011 local government reform it is part of the municipality Dorida, of which it is the seat and a municipal unit. In 2011 the population was 3,388.  Its area is 409.577 km² covering nearly one-fifth of Phocis. Lidoriki is built on the western slopes of Mount Giona and over the Mornos river valley.  It is the centre of the mountains of Dorida.

Location
Lidoriki is located west of Amfissa, northwest of Itea and east-northeast of Nafpaktos. Lidoriki is located above the Mornos artificial reservoir, formed by the Mornos Dam, completed in 1974. The reservoir supplies most of the drinking water used in Athens. Lidoriki is also connected to Amfissa via the largest tunnel in Greece with 16.5 km length. This is not a street tunnel, but an aquaeduct for the water from the Mornos reservoir.

History
Lidoriki is attested since the late 9th century in the Notitiae Episcopatuum of the Patriarchate of Constantinople as a bishopric, a suffragan of the Metropolis of Larissa. From the Chronicle of Galaxeidi it is known that the area suffered from an outbreak of plague in 1054.

After 1204 it became part of the Despotate of Epirus until 1327, when it was occupied by the Catalans of the Duchy of Athens. Under Catalan rule it belonged to the County of Salona, and was mostly controlled by the Fadrique family. A castle (Lodorich castrum) is attested in the sources in the 14th century, but no trace of it survives. It was captured by the Ottomans under Sultan Bayezid I in January 1394, and then by the Despot of the Morea, Theodore I Palaiologos, in 1397, but it was finally conquered by the Ottomans soon after. In 1448, it was visited by the scholar and traveller Cyriacus of Ancona.

Subdivisions
The municipal unit Lidoriki is subdivided into the following communities (constituent villages in brackets):
Amygdalia
Avoros
Dafnos
Diakopi
Doriko
Kallio (Kallio, Klima, Trividi)
Karoutes
Koniakos
Lefkaditi
Lidoriki
Malandrino
Pentapoli (Pentapoli, Aigitio, Lefka, Palaiokastro, Skaloula)
Perithiotissa
Stilia
Sotaina
Sykia
Vraila

Population

References

External links

Lidoriki (municipality) on GTP Travel Pages
Lidoriki (village) on GTP Travel Pages

Populated places in Phocis
Populated places of the Byzantine Empire
Defunct dioceses of the Ecumenical Patriarchate of Constantinople
Lordship of Salona